The canton of Val d'Adour-Rustan-Madiranais is an administrative division of the Hautes-Pyrénées department, southwestern France. It was created at the French canton reorganisation which came into effect in March 2015. Its seat is in Maubourguet.

It consists of the following communes:
 
Ansost
Auriébat
Barbachen
Bazillac
Bouilh-Devant
Buzon
Castelnau-Rivière-Basse
Caussade-Rivière
Escondeaux
Estirac
Gensac
Hagedet
Hères
Labatut-Rivière
Lacassagne
Lafitole
Lahitte-Toupière
Laméac
Larreule
Lascazères
Lescurry
Liac
Madiran
Mansan
Maubourguet
Mingot
Monfaucon
Moumoulous
Peyrun
Rabastens-de-Bigorre
Saint-Lanne
Saint-Sever-de-Rustan
Sarriac-Bigorre
Sauveterre
Ségalas
Sénac
Sombrun
Soublecause
Tostat
Trouley-Labarthe
Ugnouas
Vidouze
Villefranque

References

Cantons of Hautes-Pyrénées